The Star of Courage may refer to the following decorations:

 The Star of Courage (Australia), the second-highest civil award of Australia
 The Star of Courage (Canada), the second-highest civil award of Canada